Ember Ridge is a volcanic mountain ridge associated with the Mount Cayley volcanic field in British Columbia, Canada. Ember Ridge is made of a series of steep-sided domes of glassy, complexly jointed, hornblende-phyric basalt with the most recent eruptions during the Holocene. The domes have structural similarities which indicate that the domes are similar in age and could have formed by the same foundation.

Volcanoes
Lava domes associated with Ember Ridge include:
Ember Ridge North
Ember Ridge Northeast
Ember Ridge Northwest
Ember Ridge Southeast
Ember Ridge Southwest
Ember Ridge West

See also
Mount Cayley
Cascade Volcanoes
List of Cascade volcanoes
List of volcanoes in Canada
Volcanism of Canada
Volcanism of Western Canada

References

Volcanoes of British Columbia
Ridges of British Columbia
Subglacial mounds of Canada
Ridges of Canada
Pleistocene volcanoes
Holocene volcanoes
Mount Cayley volcanic field